The 68th British Academy Film Awards, more commonly known as the BAFTAs, were held on 8 February 2015 at the Royal Opera House in London, honouring the best national and foreign films of 2014. Presented by the British Academy of Film and Television Arts, accolades were handed out for the best feature-length film and documentaries of any nationality that were screened at British cinemas in 2014.

The nominations were announced on 9 January 2015 by Stephen Fry and actor Sam Claflin. The ceremony was broadcast on BBC One and BBC Three. It was hosted by Stephen Fry for the tenth time in the award's history. The ceremony opened with a number "Stevie" by a British rock band Kasabian.

Boyhood won three of its five nominations, including Best Film, Best Director for Richard Linklater, and Best Actress in a Supporting Role for Patricia Arquette. Eddie Redmayne won Best Actor in a Leading Role for The Theory of Everything, Julianne Moore won Best Actress in a Leading Role for Still Alice, and J. K. Simmons won Best Actor in a Supporting Role for Whiplash. The Grand Budapest Hotel won five of its eleven nominations, the most of any film. Jack O'Connell won the Rising Star Award. The Theory of Everything, directed by James Marsh, was voted Outstanding British Film of 2014, while The Lego Movie won Best Animated Film and Citizenfour won Best Documentary.

The telecast garnered more than 5.09 million viewers in UK, with the viewing figures slightly higher than previous year ceremony.

Winners and nominees

BAFTA Fellowship
 Mike Leigh

Outstanding British Contribution to Cinema
 BBC Films

Statistics

In Memoriam

Mickey Rooney
Mike Nichols
Alain Resnais
Eli Wallach
Harold Ramis
Dick Smith
HR Giger
Billie Whitelaw
Gordon Willis
Anita Ekberg
Dora Bryan
Gerry Fisher
Richard Kiel
Chris Collins
Assheton Gorton
Walt Martin
Sid Caesar
Robin Williams
Johnny Goodman
Luise Rainer
Gabriel Axel
Malik Bendjelloul
Oswald Morris
Samuel Goldwyn Jr.
Terry Richards
David Ryall
Lauren Bacall

See also
 4th AACTA International Awards
 87th Academy Awards
 40th César Awards
 20th Critics' Choice Awards
 67th Directors Guild of America Awards
 28th European Film Awards
 72nd Golden Globe Awards
 35th Golden Raspberry Awards
 29th Goya Awards
 30th Independent Spirit Awards
 20th Lumières Awards
 5th Magritte Awards
 2nd Platino Awards
 26th Producers Guild of America Awards
 19th Satellite Awards
 41st Saturn Awards
 21st Screen Actors Guild Awards
 67th Writers Guild of America Awards

References

External links
 68th BAFTA Awards page

Film068
2015 in British cinema
2014 film awards
2015 in London
Royal Opera House
February 2015 events in the United Kingdom
2014 awards in the United Kingdom